Monroe Township is one of the twenty townships of Darke County, Ohio, United States. The 2010 census found 1,735 people in the township, 1,347 of whom lived in the unincorporated portions of the township.

Geography
Located in the southeastern corner of the county, it borders the following townships:
Franklin Township - north
Newton Township, Miami County - northeast
Union Township, Miami County - east
Clay Township, Montgomery County - southeast
Harrison Township, Preble County - southwest
Twin Township - west
Van Buren Township - northwest corner

The village of Pitsburg is located in northwestern Monroe Township.

Name and history
It is one of twenty-two Monroe Townships statewide.

Monroe Township was established in 1836 from land given by Twin Township.

Government
The township is governed by a three-member board of trustees, who are elected in November of odd-numbered years to a four-year term beginning on the following January 1. Two are elected in the year after the presidential election and one is elected in the year before it. There is also an elected township fiscal officer, who serves a four-year term beginning on April 1 of the year after the election, which is held in November of the year before the presidential election. Vacancies in the fiscal officership or on the board of trustees are filled by the remaining trustees.  The current trustees are Rick Oswalt, Kevin McKibben, and Scott Sease, and the clerk is Dawn Oswalt.

References

External links
County website

Townships in Darke County, Ohio
Townships in Ohio